This is a list of villages located in Nokha Tehsil of Bikaner District, Rajasthan State, India.

Anasar
Ankhisar
Badh Kakara
Badhnoo
Bagseu
Bakhtawarpura
Bandhala
Bandhra
Baniya
Basi
Basi Udawatan
Beedasariya
Beekasar
Berasar
Badhla
Bhagawanpura
Bhamatsar
Bhom Bagseu
Bhom Beedasariya
Bhom Bilniyasar
Bhom Kirtasar
Bhom Maiyasar
Bhyau
Bilniyasar
Biramsar
Boodhron Ki Dhani
Chachaniya
Chainasar
Charkara
Chitana
Dasnoo
Dawa
Desalsar Bhatiyan
Desalsar Mandlawatan
Desalsar Purohitan
Dharnok
Dheengsari
Dhoopaliya
Dhoodawas
Durgapura
Gajroopdesar
Gajsukhdesar
Ghattoo
Gondusar
Govind Nagar
Hansasar
Hemolai
Himatsar
Hiyadesar
Jagrampura
Jaisingh Desar Kaliyan
Jaisingh Desar Magra
Jangloo
Jasrasar
Jegla Gogliyan
Jegala Panna Daroga
Jesalsar
Jhareli
Kahira
Kakkoo
Kakra
Kanwlisar
Kedli
Khara
Kheechiyasar
Kirtasar
Kisnasar
Koodsoo
Kookniya
Kuchor Aguni
Kuchor Athuni
Kunbhasar
Kurjadi
Ladhupura
Kalam Desar Bara
Kalam Desar Chhota
Lalsar
Leelka
Lumbasar
Madhiya
Mahrasar
Mainsar
Maiyasar
Manaksar
Mandeliya
Manyana
Masoori
Meghasar
Meusar
Moolwas
Moondar
Morkhana Aguna
Morkhana Athuna
Mukam
Munjasar
Mureedsar
Nagarjana
Nathoosar
Nimdiyasar
Nokhagaon
Nokha Mandi
Panchoo
Parwa
Pithrasar
Prahlad Pura
Raisar
Ram Nagar
Rasisar Bas Bara
Rasisar Bas Panchayatiyan
Rasisar Bas Purohitan
Rasisar Bas Talariya
Ratriya
Rora
Sadhasar
Sadhoona
Sainsar
Sajanwasi
Salundiya
Satheeka
Seelwa
Sekhasar
Sharah Kalasar
Sharah Manaksar
Sharah Panchoo
Sharah Teliya
Shri Hanumanpura
Shri Jagannath Nagar
Shri Rampura
Shindhu
Shinyala
Shijguru
Shobhana
Somasar
Surpura
Sowa
Swaroopsar
Talwa
Tant
Tardo Ki Basti
Teliyasar
Thawariya
Udasar
Udsar
Utmamdesar

References

Bikaner district
Bikaner district, Nokha Tehsil villages

Nokha Tehsil